Hyundai Marine & Fire Insurance Co., Ltd. is an insurance company headquartered in Seoul, South Korea. It is one of the largest non-life insurers in South Korea alongside Samsung Fire & Marine, DB Insurance, and KB Insurance.

History
Hyundai Marine & Fire Insurance was established as Dongbang Marine Insurance in 1955. Hyundai Group acquired Dongbang in 1983 and changed its name to Hyundai Marine & Fire Insurance in 1985. However, due to Hyundai's break up caused by a feud between the group founder Chung Ju-yung's sons, Hyundai Insurance was split from the original Group in 1999. Chung Mong-yoon, the founder's seventh son, took control of the company.

Operations
Hyundai Insurance is one of the four domestic insurers that dominates the South Korean non-insurance market. In the global market, Hyundai acquired a 25% interest in Vietinbank Insurance in 2018. The company also formed a joint venture with DiDi Chuxing and Legend Holdings for China market in 2020.

See also
 List of largest insurance companies
 Han Moo-hyup

References

External links
 : Hyundai Marine & Fire Insurance
 : Hyundai Insurance USA

Insurance companies of South Korea
Companies based in Seoul
Companies listed on the Korea Exchange
South Korean companies established in 1955
Financial services companies established in 1955
Hyundai